Dos locos en escena ("Two Crazy Ones on the Scene") is a 1960 Mexican comedy film starring Viruta and Capulina, Flor Silvestre, and Marina Camacho.

External links

Mexican comedy films
1960 comedy films
1960 films
1960s Mexican films